Killer Diller may refer to:

 Killer Diller (1948 film), an American musical race film
Killer Diller, a novel by Clyde Edgerton
 Killer Diller (2004 film), an adaptation of the novel
 a group of film executives, that were mentored by Barry Diller, see Barry Diller#"The Killer Dillers"